Ottó Vincze (born 29 August 1974) is a Hungarian former professional footballer who played as a midfielder.

He played abroad in Spain, Switzerland and Germany.

His wife is handball player Anita Görbicz. Their son, Boldizsár, was born in 2015.

External links
 Ferencvaros profile 
 
 

1974 births
Living people
People from Ózd
Sportspeople from Borsod-Abaúj-Zemplén County
Hungarian footballers
Association football midfielders
Hungary international footballers
Nemzeti Bajnokság I players
Bundesliga players
Swiss Super League players
2. Bundesliga players
FC Sion players
FC Barcelona Atlètic players
Vasas SC players
SV Waldhof Mannheim players
Ferencvárosi TC footballers
FC Energie Cottbus players
Zalaegerszegi TE players
Győri ETO FC players
Hungarian expatriate footballers
Hungarian expatriate sportspeople in Spain
Expatriate footballers in Spain
Hungarian expatriate sportspeople in Germany
Expatriate footballers in Germany
Hungarian expatriate sportspeople in Switzerland
Expatriate footballers in Switzerland
Hungarian expatriate sportspeople in Austria
Expatriate footballers in Austria